Hugh Richard Arthur Grosvenor, 2nd Duke of Westminster,  (19 March 1879 – 19 July 1953) was a British landowner and one of the wealthiest men in the world.

He was the son of Victor Grosvenor, Earl Grosvenor, son of the 1st Duke of Westminster, and Lady Sibell Lumley, the daughter of the 9th Earl of Scarborough. Through his mother's subsequent marriage after his father's death, he was the stepson of George Wyndham.

Nickname "Bendor"

From his childhood and during his adult life he was known within family circles as "Bendor", which was also the name of the racehorse Bend Or owned by his grandfather the first Duke, which won The Derby in 1880, the year following his grandson's birth. The name is a jovial reference to the ancient lost armorials of the family: Azure, a bend or, which were awarded to the Scrope family in the famous case of 1389 heard before the Court of Chivalry, known as Scrope v Grosvenor. His wife Loelia wrote in her memoirs: "Of course everybody, even his parents and sisters, would normally have addressed the baby as "Belgrave" so they may have thought that any nickname was preferable. At all events it stuck, and my husband's friends never called him anything but Bendor or Benny".

Estate
The main residence had its walls hung with master works, paintings by Goya, Rubens, Raphael, Rembrandt, Hals, and Velázquez. An avid participant in the hunting life, the Duke owned lodges reserved for the sport in Scotland and France (the Château Woolsack). According to his Times obituary (21 July 1953), "he was busy up to the day of his death in great schemes of afforestation in Cheshire, in the Lake District, and in Scotland."

For sea excursions, he had his choice of two yachts, Cutty Sark and Flying Cloud. For ground transportation he had 17 Rolls-Royce automobiles and a private train built to facilitate travel from Eaton Hall directly into London, where his townhouse Grosvenor House was located. Grosvenor House was later leased to the United States for use as the American Embassy.

Early life and character
Like many of his social class who were born to lives of privilege, the Duke was often occupied in the pursuit of pleasure. He was described as "a pure Victorian who had eyes for his shotgun, his hunters, his dogs … a man who enjoyed hiding diamonds under the pillow of his mistresses …" He was also prompt to seek military service when war broke out, volunteering to fight as a front-line officer in both the Boer War and the First World War. As a nineteen-year-old, he briefly attended a French boarding school run by the Count de Mauny, who was rumoured to have made sexual advances towards some of its pupils. In later life, the Duke was notable for being virulently opposed to homosexuality.

Military service 

Lord Grosvenor had taken a commission with the Royal Horse Guards and was in South Africa serving in the Second Boer War, when in December 1899 he succeeded his grandfather. After a brief visit back home, he returned in February 1900 to serve with the Imperial Yeomanry, as an ADC to Lord Roberts and Lord Milner. Arriving in Cape Town, he was reported to leave that city for the front in early March. He resigned his commission in December 1901, and was appointed captain of the Cheshire (Earl of Chester's) Imperial Yeomanry the following month. The war ended in May 1902. He subsequently invested in land in South Africa and Rhodesia, and visited the colony with his wife in late 1902.

In 1908, the Duke competed in the London Olympics as a motorboat racer for Great Britain. On 1 April 1908, he was named honorary lieutenant-colonel of the 16th Battalion, the London Regiment, a post he held until 1915.

In the First World War the Duke volunteered for front-line combat and served with distinction, showing both initiative in battle and technical skill with motor-cars. While attached to the Cheshire Yeomanry he developed a prototype Rolls-Royce Armoured Car for their use. During their 1916 campaign in Egypt, as part of the Western Frontier Force under General William Peyton, the Duke (then a major) commanded the armoured cars of the regiment and took part in the destruction of a Senussi force at the action of Agagia on 26 February 1916. 

On 14 March 1916, he led the armoured cars on a daring raid against superior forces that destroyed the enemy camp at Bir Asiso. Learning that the crews of HMT Moorina and HMS Tara were being held in poor conditions at Bir Hakeim, he led the nine armoured cars — with three armed but un-armoured cars and a further 28 cars and ambulances — on the Bir Hakeim rescue a  dash across the desert. Their Senussi captors attempted to run away but were gunned down by the enraged British rescuers. The prisoners attempted to stop the killings but failed. They had subsisted on little more than the snails in which the region abounded, but said their captors had not been overly cruel. However, the chief jailor responsible for the snail diet, a Moslem cleric nicknamed "Holy Joe", was hanged to general approval.

Awards and honours

The Duke received the DSO for his exploits. He was subsequently promoted colonel and on 26 May 1917, he was named honorary colonel of the regiment.

He was appointed Knight Grand Cross, Royal Victorian Order (G.C.V.O.) in 1907. 

He held the office of Lord-Lieutenant of Cheshire between 1907 and 1920.

Chanel 

In Monte Carlo in 1923, Grosvenor was introduced to Coco Chanel by Vera Bate Lombardi. The duke lavished Chanel with extravagant jewels, costly art and a home in London's Mayfair district. His affair with Chanel lasted ten years.. He was as extravagant with her as he was with all of his lovers. He purchased a home for Chanel in London's prestigious Mayfair district, and in 1927 gave her a parcel of land on the French Riviera at Roquebrune-Cap-Martin where Chanel built her villa, La Pausa. 

An illustration of both Westminster's extravagance and orchestrated technique in the courting of women has endured in the form of various apocryphal stories. He purportedly concealed a huge uncut emerald at the bottom of a crate of vegetables delivered to Chanel. Disguised as a deliveryman, Westminster appeared at Chanel's apartment with an enormous bouquet of flowers. His ruse was only uncovered after Chanel's assistant offered "the delivery boy" a tip.

Political ideology 

In 1931, the Duke, a Conservative, exposed his brother-in-law William Lygon, 7th Earl Beauchamp (1872–1938) as a homosexual to the King and Queen. He reportedly hoped to ruin the Liberal Party through Beauchamp. The king was horrified, supposedly saying, "I thought men like that shot themselves."

During the run-up to the Second World War, he supported various right-wing and anti-Semitic causes, including the Right Club. "His anti-Semitic rants were notorious", according to a biographer of Coco Chanel. 

In her book The Light of Common Day, Lady Diana Cooper reminisces back to 1 September 1939. She and her husband, the prominent Conservative Duff Cooper, were lunching at London's Savoy Grill with the Duke of Westminster. She recalls:

when he [the Duke of Westminster] added that Hitler knew after all that we were his best friends, he set off the powder-magazine. "I hope," Duff spat, "that by tomorrow he will know that we are his most implacable and remorseless enemies". Next day "Bendor", telephoning to a friend, said that if there was a war it would be entirely due to the Jews and Duff Cooper.

The Duke, known for his pro-German sympathies, was reportedly instrumental in influencing his former mistress, Coco Chanel, to use her association with Winston Churchill to broker a bilateral peace agreement between the British and the Nazis. In late 1943 or early 1944, Chanel and her current lover, Nazi espionage agent Baron Hans Gunther von Dinklage, undertook such an assignment. Codenamed "Operation Modellhut", it was an attempt through the British Embassy in Madrid, via Chanel, to influence Churchill, and thereby persuade the British to negotiate a separate peace with Germany. This mission as planned ultimately met with failure, as Churchill had no interest.

Marriages and issue

The duke married four times and was divorced three times. 
His first marriage was held on 16 February 1901, when he married Constance Edwina (Shelagh) Cornwallis-West (1876–1970). In 1909, when the couple's only son died in the absence of his mother, the duke accused his wife of neglecting the child while dallying with other men. By 1913, the couple were living apart, and both of them were consorting with lovers. Their divorce was finalized on 19 December 1919, with the duke solely accepting blame for adultery and paying his wife a settlement of £13,000, the largest in history to that date. Less than one month after the divorce, the supposedly innocent duchess married a much younger man who was an employee of the duke. The divorced couple maintained cordiality lifelong, even co-hosting debutante balls for their daughters; neither of them had children by their subsequent marriages. They had three children together:
 Lady Ursula Mary Olivia Grosvenor (21 February 1902 – 1978), married, firstly, William Patrick Filmer-Sankey in 1924 and was divorced in 1940. She married, secondly, Major Stephen Vernon in 1940. By her first husband, she had two sons, Patrick (who married the film actress Josephine Griffin) and Christopher Filmer-Sankey, who died during her lifetime. Her only child by her second husband died young. Lady Ursula's descendants by her first husband are the sole descendants of the 2nd Duke. They reside in the UK, Australia and Sweden.
 Edward George Hugh Grosvenor, Earl Grosvenor (1904–1909), who died aged 4, after an operation for appendicitis.
 Lady Mary Constance Grosvenor (27 June 1910 – 2000).
His second marriage was held on 26 November 1920, when the Duke became the second husband of Violet Mary Nelson (1891–1983). They had no children together and were divorced in 1926.
His third wife was Loelia Mary Ponsonby (1902–1993), who he married on 20 February 1930. The couple were unable to have children and divorced in 1947 after several years of separation.
His fourth wife was Anne (Nancy) Winifred Sullivan (1915–2003), who he married on 7 February 1947. They had no children, and she outlived him by fifty years.

Apart from his four marriages, the Duke also had multiple love affairs and was known to make lavish, spectacular presents to his lover of the moment. After his dalliance with Coco Chanel, he was fascinated by the Brazilian Aimée de Heeren, who was not interested in marrying him, but to whom he gave significant jewellery, once part of the French Crown Jewels.

Death and succession
The Duke died of coronary thrombosis at Loch More Lodge on his Scottish estate in Sutherland in 1953, aged 74, and was buried in the churchyard of Eccleston Church near Eaton Hall, Cheshire.

His large estate attracted then-record death duties of £18m, which took between July 1953 and August 1964 to pay off to the Inland Revenue.

He left two daughters. His titles and the entailed Westminster estate passed to his cousin, William Grosvenor, and thence to the two sons of his youngest half-uncle Lord Hugh Grosvenor (killed in action in 1914). The title is now held by Hugh Grosvenor, 7th Duke of Westminster.

Ancestry

Notes

References
Burke's Peerage & Baronetage (Various editions)
Debrett's Peerage & Baronetage (Various editions)
Leslie Field: "Bendor – The Golden Duke of Westminster" (1983)

External links

2nd Duke of Westminster
Photograph of the 2nd Duke in the First World War, from the FirstWorldWar.com website. Retrieved 4 May 2008.

1879 births
1953 deaths
Burials in Cheshire
2
People from Cheshire
Queen's Westminsters officers
Knights Grand Cross of the Royal Victorian Order
British Army personnel of the Second Boer War
British Army personnel of World War I
Companions of the Distinguished Service Order
British motorboat racers
Olympic motorboat racers of Great Britain
Motorboat racers at the 1908 Summer Olympics
Hugh Grosvenor, 2nd Duke of Westminster
Lord-Lieutenants of Cheshire
Cheshire Yeomanry officers
Imperial Yeomanry officers
Sportspeople from Cheshire